Crawford County is the name of eleven counties in the United States:

 Crawford County, Arkansas
 Crawford County, Georgia
 Crawford County, Illinois
 Crawford County, Indiana
 Crawford County, Iowa
 Crawford County, Kansas
 Crawford County, Michigan
 Crawford County, Missouri
 Crawford County, Ohio
 Crawford County, Pennsylvania
 Crawford County, Wisconsin